Police Patrol may refer to:

The Police Patrol, a 1925 American silent crime film
Riot Squad (1933 film), also released as Police Patrol, an American Pre-Code film
Ploddy the Police Car Makes a Splash, also released as Police Patrol, a 2009 Norwegian animated film